Ekaterina Dzehalevich and Lesia Tsurenko were the defending champions, but both chose not to participate.
Ekaterina Ivanova and Andreja Klepač won the title when Vitalia Diatchenko and Alexandra Panova withdrew from the final.

Seeds

Draw

Draw

References
 Main Draw
 Qualifying Draw

2011 ITF Women's Circuit
2011,Doubles
2011 in Russian tennis